Shen Xiaoying (born 2 March 1983) is a Chinese sailor who competed in the 2004 Summer Olympics.

References

1983 births
Living people
Olympic sailors of China
Chinese female sailors (sport)
Sailors at the 2004 Summer Olympics – Europe
Sportspeople from Shanghai
Asian Games medalists in sailing
Sailors at the 1998 Asian Games
Medalists at the 1998 Asian Games
Asian Games silver medalists for China
21st-century Chinese women